Shah Gul Rezai was elected to represent Ghazni Province in Afghanistan's Wolesi Jirga, the lower house of its National Legislature, in 2005.
She is a member of the Hazara ethnic group. She was a teacher from the Jaghori district.

See also 
 List of Hazara people

References

Hazara politicians
Politicians of Ghazni Province
21st-century Afghan women politicians
21st-century Afghan politicians
Living people
Members of the House of the People (Afghanistan)
Year of birth missing (living people)